Vladimer Mamuchashvili (born 29 August 1997) is a Georgian professional footballer who plays for Erovnuli Liga club Dinamo Batumi.

International career
He made his debut for the Georgia national football team on 5 September 2021 in a World Cup qualifier against Spain, a 0–4 away loss. He started the game and played the whole match.

References

External links
 
 

1997 births
Living people
Footballers from Georgia (country)
Georgia (country) youth international footballers
Georgia (country) under-21 international footballers
Georgia (country) international footballers
Association football midfielders
FC Saburtalo Tbilisi players
FC Dinamo Batumi players
Erovnuli Liga players